Brentwood Farm, also known as Adams Purchase and Smith's Adventure, is a historic home located at Westover, Somerset County, Maryland, United States. It is a two-story three-bay Flemish bond brick house built about 1738. The house was enlarged by a well-designed Shingle-style / Colonial Revival addition in 1916.

Brentwood Farm was listed on the National Register of Historic Places in 1986.

References

External links
, including photo from 1985, at Maryland Historical Trust

Houses in Somerset County, Maryland
Houses on the National Register of Historic Places in Maryland
Houses completed in 1738
Shingle Style houses
Colonial Revival architecture in Maryland
National Register of Historic Places in Somerset County, Maryland
Shingle Style architecture in Maryland